Delta Fornacis, Latinized from δ Fornacis, is a solitary, blue-white hued star near the middle of the southern constellation of Fornax. With an apparent visual magnitude of 5.00, it is faintly visible to the naked eye at night. It is drifting further away with a radial velocity of +26 km/s.

The stellar classification of Delta Fornacis is B5 III, matching an evolved B-type giant star. Around 63 million years old, the star is spinning rapidly with a projected rotational velocity of 185 km/s. It has an estimated 5.9 times the Sun's mass and radiates 1,291 times the solar luminosity from its outer atmosphere at an effective temperature of 16,230 K.

References

B-type giants
Fornax (constellation)
Fornacis, Delta
CD-32 1430
023227
017304
1134